Satyendra Singh Jamwal (1959 — 2010) was a former flag officer in the Indian Navy. He was serving as the Chief of Staff at the Southern Naval Command when he died in a tragic accidental shooting  death in 2010.

Naval Positioned held
A highly decorated officer he was being groomed to take over as the chief of the Indian Navy.Rear Admiral S S Jamwal was commissioned in the Executive Branch of the Indian Navy as a Surface Warfare Officer on 1 July 1980.
ADC to the President of India.
Naval Attache to Russia 
In-charge southern command Indian Navy.
 Commanding officer INS Delhi (D61).

Alma Mater 
The Lawrence School, Sanawar.
National Defence Academy.
 Grechko Naval War College in the then USSR.
 Defence Services Staff College at Wellington

Controversy surrounding his death
Rear Admiral S S Jamwal was accidentally killed while examining a firearm at the INS Dronacharya in Kochi.
The police investigation claimed that the death was a suicide. But the Navy said it was an accidental shooting.

References

2010 deaths
1959 births
Indian Navy admirals
Indian naval attachés
Defence Services Staff College alumni